Shove may refer to:

 Fredegond Shove (1889–1949), English poet
 Gerald Shove (1887–1947), British economist
 Lawrence Shove (flourished 1960s/1970s), English wildlife sound recordist
 Ralph Shove (1889–1966), British County Court judge, rower who competed in the 1920 Summer Olympics
 "Shove" (song), a song by L7 from their 1990 album Smell the Magic

See also
Shovel